Katherine Leatherman "Kate" Adams is an American attorney and corporate lawyer who has served as  the general counsel and senior vice president of legal and global security at Apple Inc. since 2017.

Early life and education
Katherine Leatherman Adams was born on April 20, 1964 in New York City, the daughter of John Hamilton Adams and Patricia Brandon (Smith) Adams.

In 1986, she earned a Bachelor's degree in comparative literature with French and German concentrations from Brown University, and, in 1990, a Juris Doctor degree from the University of Chicago Law School, where she was the recipient of the Order of the Coif.

Career 
After graduation, Adams worked as a law clerk for Stephen Breyer, then chief judge of the United States Court of Appeals for the First Circuit; as a trial attorney for the United States Department of Justice, Appellate Section, Environment and Natural Resources division; and as a law clerk for associate justice Sandra Day O'Connor of the Supreme Court of the United States.

She then joined the Chicago-based law firm Sidley Austin, working in its New York City office for ten years as an associate and then as a Partner. In 2003, she moved to Honeywell, where she worked for fourteen years, becoming the senior vice president and general counsel. She was in charge of the organization's global legal strategy for its 128,000 workforce in more than 100 countries, and managed the full range of the company's legal affairs.

Adams joined Apple Inc. on October 6, 2017, replacing the retiring Bruce Sewell as general counsel and SVP of legal and global security.

Adams has also taught law at New York University Law School and environmental law at Columbia University Law School.

Recognition
In September 2008, Adams and other influential New Jerseyans, including 2008 Nobel Prize in Economics winner Paul Krugman, were invited to an Economic round table hosted by Goldman Sachs' former chairman and CEO, ex-New Jersey Governor Jon Corzine.

In 2009, she was also nominated for the NJBIZ "Best 50 Women in Business awards program" which recognizes "New Jersey's most dynamic and distinguished women in business today".

In 2013, Adams was named "General Counsel of the Year" for companies whose revenue exceeds one billion dollars by NJBIZ.

See also 
List of law clerks of the Supreme Court of the United States (Seat 8)

References

1964 births
Living people
Brown University alumni
Columbia Law School faculty
New York University School of Law faculty
University of Chicago Law School alumni
Law clerks of the Supreme Court of the United States
Lawyers from Chicago
American legal scholars
American women business executives
American women academics
American women lawyers
American lawyers
Corporate lawyers
Apple Inc. executives
People associated with Sidley Austin
American women legal scholars
21st-century American women